Ziyah Vastani (born 8 December 2003) is an Indian child actress. She made her Bollywood debut in 2008 with Hindi film Contract as Binty. In 2010, she appeared in the Hindi film Bumm Bumm Bole as Rimzim. She also appeared in Indian serial Yeh Hai Mohabbatein. Her twin sister is child actress Zaynah Vastani.

Television
 Alaxmi Ka Super Parivaar as Tina Laxman Kapadiah
 Ammaji Ki Galli

Filmography
 Contract as Binty
 Bumm Bumm Bole as RimZim
 Break Ke Baad as Young Aaliya

References

External links
 
 

Living people
Indian television actresses
Indian child actresses
21st-century Indian child actresses
2003 births
Actresses from Kolkata